A Killie pie (or Kilmarnock pie) is a steak and gravy pie, created initially for Kilmarnock Football Club and sold at their stadium, Rugby Park. 

Local bakery Brownings has produced the pie for the club since 2003, and it is also sold in Aldi, SPAR and selected Scotmid stores in Scotland. Following a trademark dispute between the bakery and the football club, their retail product was renamed to "Kilmarnock Pie" in 2017.

The pie is somewhat unusual in for being a steak pie and not a Scotch pie, the type of pie normally associated with football in Scotland.

History
It won the award for best pie in football two years running and is popular among away fans for its quality.

It is made by Brownings the Bakers of Kilmarnock, who currently sponsor Kilmarnock.

See also

 List of pies, tarts and flans

References

British pies
Savoury pies
Scottish cuisine
Kilmarnock F.C.
Beef steak dishes